Bettina Schöne-Seifert (born 5 September 1956 Göttingen) is a German medical ethicist. From 2001 to 2010, she was a member of the German Ethics Council . She was awarded the Bielefeld Science Prize 2020.

Life 
She studied at University of Freiburg, University of Göttingen, University of Vienna, and Georgetown University . From 1990 to 1996, she was Lorenz Krüger's chair at the Philosophical Seminar of the University of Göttingen, with a grant from Stifterverband für die Deutsche Wissenschaft. From 1994 to 1995, she was a fellow at the Berlin Institute for Advanced Study. She is a professor at Max Planck Institute for Molecular Biomedicine. She is professor at University of Münster.

From 2001 to 2010, she was a member of the National Ethics Council.

References 

1956 births
Living people
German ethicists
German philosophers
University of Freiburg alumni
University of Vienna alumni
Georgetown University alumni
Academic staff of the University of Münster